Stadionul Municipal may refer to several sports stadiums:

Moldova
 Stadionul Municipal (Hîncești), a football stadium
 Stadionul Municipal (Tiraspol), a multi-use stadium

Romania
 Stadionul Municipal (Alexandria), a multi-use stadium, home ground of FCM Alexandria
 Stadionul Municipal (Bacău), a multi-use stadium
 Stadionul Municipal (Botoșani), a multi-use stadium, home ground of FC Botoşani
 Stadionul Municipal (Brăila), a multi-purpose stadium, home ground of Dacia Unirea Brăila
 Stadionul Municipal (Brașov), a proposed football stadium
 Stadionul Municipal (Brașov, old), a multi-use stadium demolished in 2008
 Stadionul Municipal (Buzău), a multi-purpose stadium
 Stadionul Municipal (Călărași) or Stadionul Ion Comșa, a multi-use stadium, home ground of Dunărea Călărași
 Stadionul Municipal (Caransebeș), a multi-use stadium, home ground of Viitorul Caransebeș
 Stadionul Municipal (Curtea de Argeș), a multi-use stadium, home ground of Internaţional Curtea de Argeş
 Stadionul Municipal (Dorohoi), a multi-use stadium
 Stadionul Municipal (Drobeta-Turnu Severin), a multi-use stadium
 Stadionul Municipal (Medgidia) or Iftimie Ilisei Stadium, a multi-use stadium, home ground of CS Medgidia
 Stadionul Municipal (Miercurea Ciuc), a multi-use stadium, home ground of FK Miercurea Ciuc
 Stadionul Municipal (Odorheiu Secuiesc), a multi-use stadium, home ground of AFC Odorheiu Secuiesc and Vasas Femina FC
 Stadionul Municipal (Oltenița), a multi-use stadium, home ground of CSM Oltenița
 Stadionul Municipal (Oradea) or Iuliu Bodola Stadium, a multi-purpose stadium, home ground of CA Oradea
 Stadionul Municipal (Rădăuți), a multi-use stadium, home ground of Bucovina Rădăuți
 Stadionul Municipal (Râmnicu Sărat), a multi-use stadium, home ground of Olimpia Râmnicu Sărat
 Stadionul Municipal (Râmnicu Vâlcea), a multi-purpose stadium
 Stadionul Municipal (Reghin), a multi-use stadium
 Stadionul Municipal (Roman) or Moldova Stadium, a multi-use stadium, home ground of CSM Roman
 Stadionul Municipal (Salonta), a multi-purpose stadium¸ the home ground of Olimpia Salonta
 Stadionul Municipal (Sfântu Gheorghe), a multi-use stadium, home ground of Sepsi Sfântu Gheorghe
 Stadionul Municipal (Sibiu), a multi-use stadium, home ground of FC Hermannstadt
 Stadionul Municipal (Sighetu Marmației), a multi-use stadium, home ground of Plimob Sighetu Marmației
 Stadionul Tudor Vladimirescu (disambiguation) or Stadionul Municipal (Târgu Jiu), a former and a new multi-purpose stadium
 Stadionul Municipal (Târgu Mureş), a multi-use stadium, home ground of ASA Târgu Mureș
 Stadionul Municipal (Turda), a multi-use stadium, home ground of Sticla Arieşul Turda
 Stadionul Municipal (Turnu Măgurele), a multi-use stadium, home ground of Turris Turnu Măgurele
 Stadionul Municipal (Vaslui), a multi-purpose stadium
 Stadionul Municipal (Zalău), a multi-use stadium, home ground of Sporting Zalău

See also
 Municipal Stadium (disambiguation)
 Estadio Municipal (disambiguation)
 Stade Municipal (disambiguation)
 Stadionul Orășenesc (disambiguation)